palmystery is the sixth studio album from American Jazz bassist Victor Wooten.

Track listing

"2 Timers" - (4:51)
"Cambo" - (5:25)
"I Saw God" - (4:20)
"The Lesson" - (5:55)
"Left, Right & Center" - (7:11)
"Sifu" - (7:36)
"Miss U" - (4:33)
"Flex" - (6:37)
"The Gospel" - (6:40)
"Song for My Father" - (5:18)
"Happy Song" - (4:23)
"Us 2" - (2:58)

Personnel

Victor Wooten – Bass guitar, Cora, Slide Bass, Fretless Bass, Hand Claps, Vocals, Production
Derico Watson – Drums
J.D. Blair – Drums
Joseph Wooten – Keyboards, Piano, Organ, Vocals
Rod McGaha – Trumpet
Eric Silver – Violin, Mandolin
Anthony Wellington – Bass
Regi Wooten – Guitar, Bass
Amir Ali – Violin, Lute, Darbouka, Vocals
Saundra Williams – Vocals
Steve Bailey – Fretless Bass
Richard Bona – Percussion, Vocals
Roy Wooten – Cajon, Shakers, Hand Claps
Rudy Wooten – Alto Saxophone
John Billings – Bass
Raymond Massey – Drums
Chuck Rainey – Vocals
Dennis Chambers – Drums
Will Kennedy – Drums
Mike Stern – Guitar
Neal Evans – Organ
Shawn "Thunder" Wallace – Alto Saxophone
Dane Bryant – Keyboards
Darrell Tibbs – Percussion
James Jackson – Congas
Alvin “Lil’ Al” Cordy – Bass
Earl “Big E” Walker – Drums
Roosevelt “The Doctor” Collier – Pedal Steel Guitar
Alvin Chea – Vocals
Derrick Lee – Vocals
Keith Lee – Vocals
Adam Wooten – Vocals
Holly Wooten – Vocals
Kaila Wooten – Vocals
Daniel Hunt – Vocals
Sifu Brian Edwards – Vocals
Alvin Lee – Guitar
Keb' Mo' – Slide Guitar
Barry Green – Trombone
Dorothy Wooten – Vocals
Doug Woodard – Vocals
The Woodard Family – Vocals
Howard Levy – Harmonica
Jeff Coffin – Tenor Saxophone, Baritone Saxophone
Karl Denson – Alto Saxophone

External links
Victor Wooten
Victor Wooten (myspace)

2008 albums
Victor Wooten albums
Heads Up International albums